The 2007–08 Harvard Crimson women's ice hockey team represented Harvard University. In the ECAC. the Crimson were undefeated. The squad went 22-0-0 and were the second team in ECAC women’s hockey history to finish the conference season undefeated. Titles for the Crimson women’s ice hockey team included the Beanpot, Ivy League, ECAC regular-season and ECAC tournament titles. The Crimson participated in the 2008 Frozen Four.

Player stats
Note: GP= Games played; G= Goals; A= Assists; PTS = Points; PIM = Penalties in Minutes; GW = Game Winning Goals; PPL = Power Play Goals; SHG = Short Handed Goals

2008 ECAC Tournament

Awards and honors
Caitlin Cahow, 2008 ECAC Tournament Most Valuable Player,
Sarah Vaillancourt, Patty Kazmaier Award
Katey Stone, ECAC Hockey Coach of the Year

References

External links
Official Site

Harvard Crimson women's ice hockey seasons
Harvard
Har
Harvard Crimson women's ice hockey
Harvard Crimson women's ice hockey
Harvard Crimson women's ice hockey
Harvard Crimson women's ice hockey